Marijan Prosen - Majo (born 13 March 1937) is a Slovene astronomer, author of numerous scientific and popular science books and articles on astronomy.

In 1980 he won the Levstik Award for his book Utrinki iz astronomije (Flashes from Astronomy).

References 

1937 births
Living people
Slovenian astronomers
Levstik Award laureates
People from Brežice